Mount Grier is a prominent mountain,  high, standing at the east side of the Scott Glacier where it forms the westernmost summit of the La Gorce Mountains, in the Queen Maud Mountains of Antarctica. It was discovered in December 1934 by the Byrd Antarctic Expedition geological party under Quin Blackburn, and named by Richard E. Byrd for Dr. G. Layton Grier, head of the L.D. Caulk Company of Milford, DE, who contributed dental supplies to the Byrd expeditions of 1928–30 and 1933–35.

References

Mountains of Marie Byrd Land